The National Autonomous School Workers' Trade Union (SNALS or S.N.A.L.S.; Italian Sindacato Nazionale Autonomo Lavoratori Scuola, French Syndicat Autonome des Travailleurs de l'École, German Autonome Nazionale Gewerkschaft Schulbedienstete) is an Italian autonomous school and university workers' trade union.

External links
Official Site 

Trade unions established in 1976
Trade unions in Italy